Giovanni Giudici (26 June 1924 in Le Grazie – 24 May 2011 in La Spezia) was an Italian poet and journalist.

Life 

Giovanni Giudici spent his childhood in Le Grazie, where his mother gave him a strict catholic education; her death (occurred on 8 November 1927) hurled Giovanni down to an "abyss of deprivation". 
After just one year his father married another woman and the family moved to Cadimare. 
The years between 1927 and 1935 were particularly hard since Giovanni was forced to move several times from town to town because of his father's work.
He finally settled in Monte Sacro, where he attended the local high school. 
In 1941 he enrolled at university to study medicine, but was fascinated by literature and he often attended Italian literature classes at the Faculty of Humanities ("Facoltà di Lettere"). 
In 1942 he decided to quit studying medicine and he enrolled at the Faculty of Humanities. 
He died in 2011.

Bibliography

La stazione di Pisa e altre poesie, Urbino, Istituto Statale d'Arte, 1955.
L'intelligenza col nemico, Milano, All'insegna del pesce d'oro, 1957.
L'educazione cattolica (1962-1963), Milano, All'insegna del pesce d'oro, 1963.
La vita in versi, Milano, Mondadori, 1965.
Autobiologia, Milano, Mondadori, 1969.
O beatrice, Milano, Mondadori, 1972.
Poesie scelte (1957-1974), a cura di Fernando Bandini, Milano, Mondadori, 1975.
Il male dei creditori, Milano, Mondadori, 1977.
Il ristorante dei morti, Milano, Mondadori, 1981.
Lume dei tuoi misteri, Milano, Mondadori, 1984.
Salutz (1984-1986), Torino, Einaudi, 1986.
Prove del teatro, Torino, Einaudi, 1989.
Frau Doktor, Milano, Mondadori, 1989.
Fortezza, Torino, Milano, Mondadori, 1990.
Poesie (1953-1990), Milano, Garzanti, 1991 (2 voll.).
Quanto spera di campare Giovanni, Milano, Garzanti, 1993.
Un poeta del golfo, a cura di Carlo Di Alesio, Milano, Longanesi, 1995.
Empie stelle, Milano, Garzanti, 1996.
Eresia della Sera, Milano, Garzanti, 1999.
I versi della vita, a cura di Rodolfo Zucco, Milano, Mondadori, 2000 (I Meridiani).
Dedicato ai pompieri di New York da 'Poesia', 2001.
Da una soglia infinita. Prove e poesie 1983-2002, Casette d'Ete, Grafiche Fioroni, 2004.
Prove di vita in versi. Il primo Giudici da 'Istmi. Tracce di vita letteraria', 2012.
Tutte le poesie, introduzione di Maurizio Cucchi, Milano, Mondadori, 2014.

Poetry
Collections

List of poems

References

1924 births
2011 deaths
Italian male writers